America's Best Dance Crew, often abbreviated as ABDC, was an American competitive dance reality television series that features both national and international dance crews. The show was produced by singer, record producer, and former American Idol judge Randy Jackson. The series premiered on February 7, 2008, on MTV. It was originally developed for NBC as World Moves.

The show was hosted by actor Mario Lopez, and featured television personality Layla Kayleigh as the backstage correspondent. The judging panel consisted of hip hop recording artist Lil Mama, singer-songwriter JC Chasez, and dancer Dominic "D-Trix" Sandoval. Former judges included hip hop choreographer Shane Sparks and R&B singer Omarion.

After an initial seventh season run, America's Best Dance Crew was cancelled in 2012 due to declining ratings. However, on January 10, 2015, MTV announced that the series would be revived for an eighth season.

The new season, titled America's Best Dance Crew All-Stars: Road to the VMAs, premiered on July 29, 2015. Hosted by Jason Dundas, the revival features a new judging panel: hip hop artist T-Pain, recording artist Teyana Taylor, and Broadway performer Frankie Grande.

Overview
America's Best Dance Crew is a competitive reality show where dance crews showcase their talent and compete for a $100,000 (USD) grand prize and the golden ABDC trophy (a figure of a b-boy doing a freeze, with its legs moving like a bobblehead). Each week, the crews are given a challenge. The challenges are different for each crew, but have the same general concept or share a specific theme. To begin each episode, host Mario Lopez reveals, in no particular order, which crews are safe and which crews are at risk for elimination. After the crews in the bottom perform their routines, the judges decide which crew will advance to the next round.

Another unique aspect of ABDC is the crew banner. Each banner's logo represents its respective crew, appearing during interviews, performances, and on various merchandise. It is also used as a transition effect. When a crew is eliminated, their banner falls from the top of the stadium, where the banners of the crews still in the running stand. The contestants are allowed to dance one final time on the stage as they "walk it out" to the song of the same name.

Season summary

Controversy
MTV and Randy Jackson were sued by entertainer and activist Dwight McGhee, publicly known as rapper Citizen Charlie Kane, in 2010. Kane had pitched the show concept to MTV in 2004 and MTV "passed" on the concept. When Charlie Kane saw a commercial that depicted the 1970s Warriors' movie that looked exactly like his pitch demo DVD, he filed the suit. Many production elements between the show and Kane's 2003 copyright registration of a "break-dancing league" were identical. TMZ and NYPost were a couple among the many major media organizations to run the story. Viacom/MTV and Charlie Kane came to a mutual settlement in 2011.

International distribution
ABDC airs on MTV in the Caribbean, Spain, Italy, Portugal, Argentina, Russia (by the alias of "Короли Танцпола", lit. "Kings of the Dancefloor"), Finland, Hungary, Netherlands, Norway, and the United Kingdom, Germany, Ukraine (by the alias of "Танцювальні бої", lit. "Dance Battles"), and Romania.

In Canada, the show airs on both MuchMusic and Musique Plus (the episodes on MP are 2 years late) and in Latin America, the show airs on Warner Channel.
The show also airs on AB1 and MTV France, where it is called Dance Crew USA in France, Solar TV, Jack TV, and The Game Channel in the Philippines, 
Fiji One in Fiji, and YAN TV (?), VTV3 (Nhom nhay sieu Viet, 2021) in Vietnam.

Additional notes
 The opening title sequence created by Framework Studio won a Telly Award in 2009.

References

External links
 
 

 
2008 American television series debuts
2012 American television series endings
2015 American television series debuts
2015 American television series endings
2000s American reality television series
2010s American reality television series
English-language television shows
MTV reality television series
Television series by Warner Horizon Television
American television series revived after cancellation